Aricia anteros, the blue argus, is a European butterfly in the family Lycaenidae. It has a wingspan of 30–34 mm. In Europe it can be found in Macedonia, Albania, Greece, Bulgaria, Serbia, Croatia, Montenegro, Bosnia and Herzegovina,  Romania, Ukraine and in Turkey. Its primary larval food plants are Geranium sanguineum and Geranium macrorrhizum .

Description from Seitz

The males dusted with a very bright metallic blue as far as the narrow black  margin, with a small but distinct discocellular spot on the forewing. Especially on the Balkan Peninsula, in Asia Minor and Syria. European specimens bear often some small red spots on the upperside of the hindwing before the outer margin; this is ab. pupillata Aign. — crassipunctata Christ. are Armenian specimens with the discocellular spot of the forewing above much  enlarged. — Not rare in June and July, in Europe often restricted to the mountains.

References

anteros